Carlos Enrique Valdés Parra (born 22 May 1985) is a Colombian former professional footballer.

Club career

Colombia
Valdés began his career in 2005 with Real Cartagena and appeared in 33 league matches. After impressing with Cartagena, Valdés joined storied Colombian club América de Cali the following campaign and was a stalwart in defense for the club for four years, where he appeared in 97 matches and scored 4 goals. In 2009, he joined Independiente Santa Fe and continued to be one of the top defenders in Colombia.

United States
On 20 January 2011, Valdés officially joined Major League Soccer side Philadelphia Union on a one-year loan deal. He made his debut for the Union on 19 March 2011, in the team's season opener for the 2011 MLS season, a 1–0 victory over Houston Dynamo. In Week 7 of the season, Valdés was named to the MLS Team of the Week for his performance against the San Jose Earthquakes. On 5 August 2011, the Union announced that it had secured the full rights to Valdes from his former club, Independiente Santa Fe of the Colombian First Division.

Loans
Seeking to increase his national team prospects, Valdés returned to Santa Fe on loan in 2013 and later joined San Lorenzo de Almagro of the Primera Division Argentina on another loan He briefly returned to Philadelphia following the 2014 World Cup before being loaned to  Club Nacional de Football of Uruguay in 2015. He and Philadelphia terminated his deal in 2015.

Atlético Socopó
In 2017, after a year-long injury, Valdés is signed by Venezuelan club Atlético Socopó, who is going to play in the first division for the first time.

International career
Valdés played with the Colombia U-20 squad at the 2005 South American Youth Championship, which Colombia hosted and won. He then competed at the 2005 FIFA World Youth Championship in the Netherlands, helping Colombia to the Round of 16 before losing to the eventual champions, Argentina. In 2008, he made his debut for the Colombian senior national team.

The 13 May 2014 was included by coach Jose Pekerman in the preliminary list of 30 players for the World Cup of 2014.13 14 Finally, he was selected in the final 23-man roster on 2 June.

International goals
Scores and results list Colombia's goal tally first.

Honours

Club
América de Cali
Categoría Primera A (1): 2008-II
Independiente Santa Fe
Copa Colombia (1): 2009
Superliga Colombiana (1): 2013
San Lorenzo
Copa Libertadores (1): 2014

Individual
Major League Soccer All-Star Team: 2012

Career statistics

Club

Updated 6 July 2013

International

Statistics accurate as of 6 June 2015

References

External links
Official Site

1985 births
Living people
Colombian footballers
Colombian expatriate footballers
Colombia international footballers
Colombia under-20 international footballers
Philadelphia Union players
Real Cartagena footballers
América de Cali footballers
Independiente Santa Fe footballers
Club Nacional de Football players
San Lorenzo de Almagro footballers
Categoría Primera A players
Argentine Primera División players
Expatriate soccer players in the United States
Expatriate footballers in Argentina
Expatriate footballers in Uruguay
Major League Soccer All-Stars
Major League Soccer players
2014 FIFA World Cup players
2015 Copa América players
Footballers from Cali
Association football defenders